The Washington is a Grade II listed public house at 50 England's Lane, Belsize Park, London.

It was built in about 1865 by the developer Daniel Tidey.

References

Grade II listed buildings in the London Borough of Camden
Grade II listed pubs in London
Belsize Park
Pubs in the London Borough of Camden